The 2017 Munster Senior Football Championship was the 2017 installment of the annual Munster Senior Football Championship organised by the Munster GAA. It is one of the four provincial competitions of the 2017 All-Ireland Senior Football Championship. Kerry are the defending Munster champions.	

Both 2016 Munster finalists receive a bye into this year's Munster semi-finals. The four remaining teams play two quarter-final matches with the winners completing the semi-final line-up. All matches are knock-out.  The draw for the competition was held on 13 October 2016 and broadcast on RTÉ2 television.

Teams
The Munster championship is contested by all six counties in the Irish province of Munster.

Bracket

Quarter-finals

Semi-finals

Munster Final

See also
 2017 All-Ireland Senior Football Championship
 2017 Connacht Senior Football Championship
 2017 Leinster Senior Football Championship
 2017 Ulster Senior Football Championship

References

External links
 Munster GAA website

2M
Munster Senior Football Championship